The 2015 IBSA Judo European Championships were held in Odivelas, Portugal, from 25–30 November 2015. It was held at the Multiusos Sports Hall in the city. The championship was the 13th to be held and was the last event whereby European athletes could collect points for qualification to the 2016 Summer Paralympics in Rio. Each country could send a maximum of two competitors per eight division.  The competition is open to all classification of visually impaired athlete (B1, B2 and B3), who compete against each other.

Russia finished on top of the Championship table by total number of medals won (17), and class of medals won.

Men's events

Women's events

Medal summary

Medal table

 Host nation

References

External links
 
 Official website of IBSA Judo

IBSA European Judo Championships
IBSA European Judo Championships
Judo, European Championships IBSA
European Championships 2015, IBSA
Judo, European Championships 2015, IBSA]
Judo
Judo